Yun Jong-suk (born 21 December 1986) is a North Korean short track speed skater. She competed in the women's 500 metres event at the 2006 Winter Olympics.

References

External links
 

1986 births
Living people
North Korean female short track speed skaters
Olympic short track speed skaters of North Korea
Short track speed skaters at the 2006 Winter Olympics
Place of birth missing (living people)
Asian Games medalists in short track speed skating
Short track speed skaters at the 2003 Asian Winter Games
Short track speed skaters at the 2007 Asian Winter Games
Medalists at the 2003 Asian Winter Games
Asian Games silver medalists for North Korea
21st-century North Korean women